Peter Chong may refer to:

 Peter Chong (karateka) (born 1941), Singaporean martial artist
 Peter Chong (criminal) (born 1943), American criminal
 Peter Loy Chong (born 1961), Catholic Archbishop of Suva, Fiji
 Peter Chong (actor) (1898–1985), Chinese-American actor